Primera Plana formerly known as "A Calzón Quita'o" is a television talk show in Puerto Rico broadcast on WAPA-TV. 
The show features the journalist, radio reporter and television reporter Rubén Sánchez.

The show features interviews with artists, musicians, politicians, and others. A Calzón Quita'o gained much popularity because of Rubén Sánchez's aggressive debating, bold questions, and sometimes notorious style of interviewing. The show has also received much controversy surrounding the show's guests and topics. Primera Plana has gained one of the best ratings in Wapa Television recently. It airs live weekdays at 4:00pm. A special primetime edition is broadcast, also live, on Fridays at 9:00pm.

The show features topics such as internet safety.

Producers 

Created and produced by Agustín Rosario 
General Producer Carlos Miranda

References

Puerto Rican television series